Rezauddin Stalin (born 22 November 1962) is a Bangladeshi poet and a television personality of Bangladesh.

He is deputy director of the Nazrul Institute.

Literary works

Poems
 Purnopran Jabo(পূর্ণপ্রাণ যাবে) - 1983
 Danrao Pathibar(দাঁড়াও পথিকবর)-1986
 Firini Obadhya Ami(ফিরিনি অবাধ্য আমি)-1985
 Venge Ano Vitorey Ontorey(ভেঙে আনো ভিতরে অন্তরে)-1987
 Seisob Chodmobesh(সেইসব ছদ্মবেশ)-1989
 Anguler Jonnyo Dwoirath(আঙুলের জন্য দ্বৈরথ)-1992
 Aschorjo Ayenaguli(আশ্চর্য আয়নাগুলো)-1992
 Ora Amake Khunjchilo(ওরা আমাকে খুঁজছিল)-1997
 Somvabonar Niche(সম্ভাবনার নিচে)-1996
 Prithibitey Vor Dekhini Kokhono(পৃথিবীতে ভোর থেকে দেখিনি কখনো)-1997
 Asheerbad Kori Amar Dussomoyke(আশীর্বাদ করি আমার দুঃসময়কে)-1998
 Hingsro Noishovoj(হিংস্র নৈশভোজ)-1999
 Ami Prithibir Dikey Aschi(আমি পৃথিবীর দিকে আসছি)-2000
 Loakgulo Sob chena(লোকগুলো সব চেনা)-2001
 Niropekkhotar Proshno(নিরপেক্ষতার প্রশ্ন)-2002
 Padoshabda Shono Amar Kanthaswar(পদশব্দ শোন আমার কণ্ঠস্বর)-2003
 Punoruthan Parba(পুনরুত্থান পর্ব)-2004
 Obishruto Bartaman(অবিশ্রুত বর্তমান)-2005
 Muhuurter Mohakabya(মুহূর্তের মহাকাব্য)-2006
 Onirdisto Deerghoshwas(অনির্দিষ্ট দীর্ঘশ্বাস)-2008
 Vanga Dalaner Swaralipi(ভাঙা দালানের স্বরলিপি)-2009
 Keu Amake Grohon Koreni(কেউ আমাকে গ্রহণ করেনি)-2009
and 16 more to name.

Awards
 Bangla Academy Literary Award, (2006)

References

External links
 THE MIDDLE CLASS
 http://www.boiwala.com/writer.php?id=240
 http://www.jessore.info/content.php?id=596

Bangladeshi male poets
Bengali male poets
Bengali-language poets
Bengali writers
Bengali-language writers
1962 births
Living people
Recipients of Bangla Academy Award